The Reichardt House is a historic house at 1201 Welch Street in Little Rock, Arkansas.  Built in 1870 and significantly altered in subsequent decades, it is now a two-story five-bay wood-frame structure, with a side gable roof and weatherboard siding.  A central gabled section projects from the front, and a single-story porch wraps across the front, supported by delicate turned posts.  The house was built by Edward Reichardt, an early German immigrant to the area.

The house was listed on the National Register of Historic Places in 1975.

See also
National Register of Historic Places listings in Little Rock, Arkansas

References

Houses on the National Register of Historic Places in Arkansas
Victorian architecture in Arkansas
Houses completed in 1870
Houses in Little Rock, Arkansas